The Central Line is a  long railway line between Sundsvall and Storlien in central Sweden (Västernorrland County and Jämtland County). The railway shares line with Inland Line between Brunflo and Östersund while the line between Ånge and Bräcke is double track. This requires all trains to Norway to be diesel trains.

SJ AB operates night trains with sleeping cars from Storlien or Duved to either Stockholm, Gothenburg or Malmö. The section between Sundsvall and Trondheim is operated by Tågkompaniet under Norrtåg ownership with Class 92 diesel multiple units between Östersund and Trondheim, and Regina trains between Sundsvall and Östersund. Snälltåget also operates Utmanartåget with a biweekly connection between Storlien and Malmö via Stockholm.

History
From 1875 the Swedish State Railways were building Norrland Crossline, which opened 1879 between Torpshammar and Östersund. Before 1881 it had no connection to the rest of Sweden (only steamboat from Sundsvall), until the railway between Stockholm and Ånge was finished. At the same time, the governments were building a railway east from Trondheim, with the Government of Sweden building the Swedish part, finished 1882. The Government of Norway (Norway was in a union with Sweden at the time) built the Norwegian section, Meråker Line, which was opened in 1886. In 1885 the Sundsvall-Torpshammar Railway was bought by the state and rebuilt to standard gauge the following year. The railway was then known as the Norrland Crossline until it got the present name in the early 1990s. In November 2013 the railway had to be closed near the border because of the high risk of landslide, opened again February 2015.

References

External links

 Trafikverket page on Mittbanan 
 Järnväg.net page on Mittbanan 

Railway lines in Sweden
Railway lines opened in 1878
1878 establishments in Sweden
Standard gauge railways in Sweden